Francis Nicoll (1771–1835) was a senior Church of Scotland who served both as Principal of St Andrews University and Moderator of the General Assembly of the Church of Scotland in 1809, the highest position in the Church of Scotland

Life

He was born in Lossiemouth in 1771 the third son of John Nicoll, a merchant. He was educated at King's College, Aberdeen graduating MA in 1789.

He was licensed to preach as a Church of Scotland minister by the Presbytery of Elgin in 1793, but, failing to find a patron (as was then required) he acted as a tutor to the family of Sir James Grant of Grant. In September 1797 he was ordained as minister of Auchtertool, translating to the parish of Mains and Strathmartine in September 1799.

He was award a Doctor of Divinity (DD) in 1807.

In 1809 he succeeded Rev Dr Andrew Grant as Moderator of the General Assembly of the Church of Scotland.

In 1819 he was appointed Principal of St Andrews University in place of Rev Prof James Playfair, resigning in September 1824. He died on 8 October 1835.

Artistic Recognition

He was portrayed by Robert Moore Hodgetts.

Family

In October 1814 he married Anne Ramsay of Edinburgh (d.1842). They had two daughters and a son.

References
 

1771 births
1835 deaths
Alumni of the University of Aberdeen
Principals of the University of St Andrews
Moderators of the General Assembly of the Church of Scotland